Juan Luis Barrios Nieves (born June 24, 1983) is a Mexican runner. He competed in the 5000 m at the 2008 and 2012 Olympics and finished seventh-eighth. He placed 14th in the same event at the 2007 and came 18th in the 10,000 metres at the 2009 World Championships.

He won silver medals in the 5000 m and 1500 metres at the 2007 Pan American Games. He has won three consecutive titles in the 1500 m at the Central American and Caribbean Games, winning in 2002, 2006 and 2010. He also has a threepeat in the 5000 m in 2006, 2010 and 2014, plus he added the 10,000 metres title in 2014. He has also won gold medals on the track at the Central American and Caribbean Championships.

Barrios was the inaugural winner of the NACAC Cross Country Championships in 2005 and repeated the feat the following year, in addition to taking the team gold with Mexico. He made his debut over the marathon distance in March 2011, running at the LALA International Marathon in Torreon, Coahuila, and recorded a time of 2:14:20 hours.

Personal bests

Outdoor
800 m: 1:48.43 min A –  Ciudad de México, May 22, 2004
1500 m: 3:37.71 min –  Rio de Janeiro, July 25, 2007
One mile: 3:57.34 min –  Dublin, July 17, 2013
3000m: 7:37.64 min –  Rieti, August 27, 2006
5000m: 13:09.81 min –  New York, New York, June 11, 2011
10,000m: 27:28.82 min –  Wageningen, May 30, 2012
Half marathon: 1:00:40 hrs –  Marugame, March 15, 2015
Marathon: 02:10:55 hrs –  Tokyo, Feb 25, 2018

International competitions

References

External links

 
 
 
 nikecorredores.blogspot.com

1983 births
Living people
Athletes from Mexico City
Mexican male long-distance runners
Mexican male middle-distance runners
Athletes (track and field) at the 2007 Pan American Games
Athletes (track and field) at the 2008 Summer Olympics
Athletes (track and field) at the 2011 Pan American Games
Athletes (track and field) at the 2012 Summer Olympics
Athletes (track and field) at the 2015 Pan American Games
Olympic athletes of Mexico
World Athletics Championships athletes for Mexico
Pan American Games gold medalists for Mexico
Pan American Games silver medalists for Mexico
Pan American Games bronze medalists for Mexico
Pan American Games medalists in athletics (track and field)
Central American and Caribbean Games gold medalists for Mexico
Competitors at the 2002 Central American and Caribbean Games
Competitors at the 2006 Central American and Caribbean Games
Competitors at the 2010 Central American and Caribbean Games
Competitors at the 2014 Central American and Caribbean Games
Competitors at the 2018 Central American and Caribbean Games
Central American and Caribbean Games medalists in athletics
Medalists at the 2007 Pan American Games
Medalists at the 2011 Pan American Games
Medalists at the 2015 Pan American Games
21st-century Mexican people